There are three distinct chemical compounds which are dichlorobenzenes:
1,2-Dichlorobenzene or ortho-dichlorobenzene;
1,3-Dichlorobenzene or meta-dichlorobenzene;
1,4-Dichlorobenzene or para-dichlorobenzene.

All three isomers are colorless organic compounds with the formula CHCl. They differ structurally based on where the two chlorine atoms are attached to the ring, like bracelets with two beads of one color and four beads of another color.

Biodegradation 
Rhodococcus phenolicus is a bacterium species able to degrade dichlorobenzene as its sole carbon source.

References 

Chlorobenzenes